Mount Sulivan is a mountain on West Falkland, Falkland Islands, not far from Lake Sulivan. It is to the northwest of Fox Bay.

References

Sulivan